Blood and Fire is the third album by the British rock band The Eighties Matchbox B-Line Disaster. It was released on 10 May 2010 by Black Records and the band's own label, No Death Records. It was released as a Digipak CD and as an LP on coloured vinyl with a bonus poster.

It was the band's first major album release since the departure of guitarist Andy Huxley in 2004. The album was recorded in France by the band and in London by Thomas Mitchener. Both sessions were mixed by Kevin Vanbergen. The album's first single, "Love Turns To Hate", was released on 10 May 2010 and is available as a digital download or on orange vinyl.

The album was ranked 17th out of 25 in the Best Garage Rock Albums of All Time category by the Album of the Year and it was ranked as number one in the 2010 Best Garage Rock Albums category.

Track listing
"Love Turns to Hate" - 3.09
"Mission from God" - 2.36
"So Long Goodnight" - 4.25
"Under My Chin" - 2.18
"Riptin" - 3.25
"Monsieur Cutts" - 2.32
"I Hate the Blues" - 2.49
"Man for All Seasons" - 2.14
"Don't Ask Me to Love You" - 2.41
"Homemade" - 4.05
"Never Be the Same" - 3.21
"Are You Living" - 4.08

B-sides

Personnel
Guy McKnight – vocals
Marc Norris – rhythm guitar
Tristan McLenahan – lead guitar
Sym Gharial – bass
Tom Diamantopoulo – drums

Singles

References

2010 albums
Psychobilly albums
The Eighties Matchbox B-Line Disaster albums